Musalı (also, Musa-Kend and Musaly) is a village and municipality in the Jalilabad Rayon of Azerbaijan.  It has a population of 1,725.

References 

Populated places in Jalilabad District (Azerbaijan)